Wilczyńskie Lake  is a lake in Gmina Wilczyn, Konin County, Greater Poland Voivodeship, north-central Poland, near the village of Wilczyn. It's a ribbon lake. In 2016 there was much discussion about the lake drying up and disappearing due to nearby lignite coal mines.1 

Lakes of Greater Poland Voivodeship
Konin County